Phostria radicalis is a moth in the family Crambidae. It was described by Francis Walker in 1866. It is found in New Guinea and Seram in Indonesia.

References

Phostria
Moths described in 1866
Moths of New Guinea
Moths of Indonesia